Buchy is a commune in the Seine-Maritime department in the Normandy region in northern France. On 1 January 2017, the former communes of Bosc-Roger-sur-Buchy and Estouteville-Écalles were merged into Buchy.

The inhabitants of the town of Buchy are called Buchois, Buchoises in French.

Geography
Montérolier-Buchy station has rail connections to Rouen, Lille and Amiens.

Heraldry

Population

Places of interest
 The church of Sts. Peter & Paul, dating from the sixteenth century.
 An eleventh-century feudal motte.
 The seventeenth-century market hall.

See also
Communes of the Seine-Maritime department

References

Communes of Seine-Maritime